The 1919 Liberal Party of Canada leadership election was the first leadership convention held by a federal political party in Canada. It was originally called by the Liberal leader, Sir Wilfrid Laurier, as a national policy convention with the intention of reinvigorating the Liberal Party after eight years of being in opposition.  The convention was also intended to re-unite the party, which had split as a result of the Conscription Crisis of 1917. The party had divided into Laurier Liberals, who remained in opposition, and a Liberal–Unionist faction which joined the wartime Union government of Sir Robert Borden in support of conscription. Laurier's death on February 17, 1919 resulted in the meeting being reconfigured as a leadership convention. Previous party leaders in Canada had been chosen by the parliamentary caucus or the outgoing leader. However, the Liberal caucus no longer felt that it was representative of Canada's linguistic and religious diversity and that allowing the entire party to select the leader would result in a more representative choice.

Candidates
William Lyon Mackenzie King, 44, was the former Minister of Labour (1909-1911) who had served as Member of Parliament for Waterloo North from 1908 until his defeat in 1911.
William Stevens Fielding, 70, the MP for Shelburne and Queen's was a former Minister of Finance (1896-1911) and Premier of Nova Scotia (1884-1896).
George Perry Graham, 60, the former MP for Renfrew South 
Daniel Duncan McKenzie, 60, the Liberal Party's interim leader since Laurier's death and the MP for North Cape Breton and Victoria.

There was also an attempt to draft Saskatchewan Premier William Melville Martin, a former Liberal MP, but he declined to run.

King had run as a Laurier Liberal in the 1917 federal election but was defeated. Fielding, who had long been seen as Laurier's natural successor, had opposed Laurier's stand on conscription and had returned to the House of Commons in 1917 as a Liberal–Unionist MP supporting the Borden government but declining the offer of a cabinet position. Graham had sat out of the 1917 election and McKenzie had run and kept his seat as a Laurier Liberal.

Convention
Voting delegates were made up of Senators, MPs, defeated candidates, premiers and provincial party leaders, presidents of provincial Liberal associations, and three delegates from each riding. Nominations were accepted in writing until the first ballot began at 3:45 pm. King lead Fielding on the first and second ballots. Graham and McKenzie withdrew in quick succession leading to the cancellation of the third and fourth ballots, respectively, which had already been underway when the successive withdrawals occurred. On the final ballot King defeated Fielding by 38 votes.

King was supported by labour elements, Quebec delegates, and the left-wing of the party. Fielding, who openly opposed the radical platform adopted by the convention, threatened to seek support from the parliamentary caucus for rejection of the platform. He was opposed by many Quebec delegates as well as delegates from his home province of Nova Scotia due to his previous stance on conscription and was supported by the right wing of the party, many western Canadian delegates, and the business establishment in Montreal.

Results

Graham withdrew while voting for the third ballot was underway. McKenzie withdrew while voting for the fourth ballot was in process. Votes were not counted for either one, and the convention proceeded directly to the fifth ballot.

References

1919
1919 elections in Canada
Liberal Party of Canada leadership election